is a Japanese tokusatsu television series. that premiered on April 5, 2013, on TV Tokyo. Written and directed by Makoto Yokoyama, Yami o Terasu Mono is the third television series in the Garo metaseries, but is set in a different continuity than previous and following entries.

Story
Ryuga Dougai, a Makai Knight who has inherited the title of Garo the Golden Knight, is tasked to hunt them down. However, the Garo Armor had long lost its golden radiance and it is not as powerful as it used to be. Joining forces with fellow Makai Knights Aguri and Takeru, along with Makai Priests Burai and Rian, Ryuga confronts the dark side of the city that is plagued by a rare breed of Horrors called , and the mystery behind why a portion of the Garo Armor's golden light is restored every time he destroys one of them.

Episodes

Sequel

 will be both a film and a television series that serve as sequels to Yami o Terasu Mono. Wataru Kuriyama and Miki Nanri reprise their roles and are joined by new cast members (among them is Masahiro Inoue as the series antagonist Jinga). The film adaptation was released in theatres on March 28, 2015, while the television series began broadcast on April 3, 2015.

Cast
: 
: 
: 
: 
: 
: 
: 
: 
: 
: 
:

Songs
Opening themes

Composition: Yoshichika Kuriyama, Shiho Terada
Episodes: 1–12, 24

Lyrics & Composition: Hironobu Kageyama
Arrangement: Yoshichika Kuriyama, Shiho Terada
Artist: JAM Project
Episodes: 13–23
In episode 24, it is used as the ending theme.
Ending themes
"So Long"
Composition & Arrangement: Yūji Toriyama
Lyrics & Artist: Kohei Otomo
Episodes: 1–12, 22
"PLATONIC"
Lyrics & Composition: Masami Okui
Arrangement: Yoshichika Kuriyama, Shiho Terada
Artist: JAM Project featuring Masami Okui
Episodes: 13–21, 23
"Brave Heart"
Composition & Arrangement: Yūji Toriyama
Lyrics & Artist: Kohei Otomo
Episodes: 25

JAM Project, performer on the theme songs for all previous entries in the franchise, will also perform the series theme songs. Kageyama, a member of the cast and JAM Project, says that the song he has written has already put him in tears in how much it has moved him.

References

External links

TV Tokyo website

Japanese horror fiction television series
Garo (TV series)
TV Tokyo original programming
2013 Japanese television series debuts
2013 Japanese television series endings
Tokusatsu television series
Martial arts television series